Nicola Bellomo may refer to:
Nicola Bellomo (general) (1881–1945), Italian general
Nicola Bellomo (footballer) (born 1991), Italian footballer